Lauris Bajaruns (born 31 March 1989) is a Latvian professional ice hockey player. He is currently a free agent having last played for HK Kurbads of the Latvian Hockey Higher League.

He participated at the 2015 IIHF World Championship for the Latvian national team.

References

External links

1989 births
Living people
Les Aigles de Nice players
HC '05 Banská Bystrica players
Rytíři Kladno players
Latvian ice hockey forwards
HK Liepājas Metalurgs players
Metallurg Zhlobin players
People from Ventspils
HK Poprad players
Rungsted Seier Capital players
HC Stadion Litoměřice players
Latvian expatriate sportspeople in the Czech Republic
Latvian expatriate sportspeople in Denmark
Latvian expatriate sportspeople in Slovakia
Latvian expatriate sportspeople in Germany
Latvian expatriate sportspeople in Belarus
Latvian expatriate sportspeople in France
Expatriate ice hockey players in the Czech Republic
Expatriate ice hockey players in Denmark
Expatriate ice hockey players in Slovakia
Expatriate ice hockey players in Germany
Expatriate ice hockey players in Belarus
Expatriate ice hockey players in France
Latvian expatriate ice hockey people